The Melbourne Arts Precinct is home to a series of galleries, performing arts venues and spaces located in the  Southbank district of Melbourne, Victoria, in Australia. It includes such publicly-funded venues as Arts Centre Melbourne, National Gallery of Victoria, and Southbank Theatre, along with various offices and training institutions of arts organisations.

As of 2022 the precinct is undergoing a major transformation, including the build of Australia’s largest contemporary art gallery, The Fox: NGV Contemporary.

History 
In 2008, it was announced by the Government of Victoria the precinct would receive a A$128 million upgrade, with the major refurbishment of Hamer Hall as its centrepiece. The combined Melbourne Recital Centre and MTC Theatre complex, which opened in February 2009, won the Moore Stephens Award for Public Buildings at the Property Council of Australia - the country's highest award for a public building.

In 2014, the Victorian government released the Melbourne Arts Precinct Blueprint, initiated by the former state Premier and Minister for the Arts Ted Ballieu for a cost of $900,000 (given by both federal and state government). Led by Creative Victoria, its intention was to establish a vision for the precinct along with prioritising any future development.

This initial investment also included the purchase of the building at 77 Southbank Boulevard, to be demolished so NGV Contemporary could be built.

This investment was increased to $1.46 billion in the Victorian Budget 2020/21. and lifted further to $1.7 billion in November 2021.

Description
The Melbourne Arts Precinct is located in Southbank, centred on St Kilda Road. It differs from the East End Theatre District in the city centre, as most of the galleries and venues in the precinct are publicly funded.

Administrative offices, broadcast studios, schools and training institutions of many arts organisations are also located in the precinct.

Transformation project
The transformation project, which was announced in 2018, is being overseen by a new government corporation, the Melbourne Arts Precinct Corporation (MAP Co), which is also responsible for the revitalisation of Federation Square. Katrina Sedgwick, former CEO of ACMI, was appointed as the inaugural CEO of MAP Co in March 2022.

In April 2022, it was announced that the new gallery, part of the National Gallery of Victoria (NGV) would be named The Fox: NGV Contemporary, in recognition of a $100 million donation from Lindsay Fox  and his wife Paula Fox .

The gallery is designed by Angelo Candalepas and Associates, leading a collective of 20 architectural, design and engineering firms which won a national competition.

Public venues and galleries
Arts Centre Melbourne, including Hamer Hall, the State Theatre, the Playhouse, the Fairfax Studio and other venues
National Gallery of Victoria
Various venues at the Victorian College of the Arts, including Grant Street Theatre, Space 28, Federation Hall and the Margaret Lawrence Gallery
Buxton Contemporary
Southbank Theatre
Melbourne Recital Centre
Iwaki Auditorium at the ABC Centre
Australian Centre for Contemporary Art (ACCA), with its building also referred to as Ngargee (a Bunurong word for describing "gathering for celebration") 
The Coopers Malthouse
Sidney Myer Music Bowl
Federation Square, which is home to The Ian Potter Centre: NGV Australia, ACMI (formerly the Australian Centre for the Moving Image), and the Koorie Heritage Trust.

Arts administration and education
 ABC Centre of the Australian Broadcasting Corporation, including
Studio 31
Melbourne Symphony Orchestra (MSO) 
The Australian Ballet, including the Australian Ballet School
Chunky Move at ACCA
 Creative Victoria
Melbourne Conservatorium of Music
Melbourne Theatre Company (MTC).
Malthouse Theatre
Musica Viva
Victorian College of the Arts (University of Melbourne)
Victorian College of the Arts Secondary School (VCASS)

See also
List of theatres in the Melbourne City Centre
Melbourne Arts Precinct Corporation

References 

Arts centres in Australia
Concert halls in Australia
Art museums and galleries in Melbourne
Landmarks in Melbourne
Buildings and structures in the City of Melbourne (LGA)
Music venues in Melbourne
Southbank, Victoria